Campusano is a surname. Notable people with the surname include:

Giovanni Campusano (born 1993), Chilean footballer
Julieta Campusano (1918–1991), Chilean politician
Luis Campusano (born 1998), American baseball player
Sil Campusano (born 1965), Dominican Republic baseball player

See also
Campuzano